Telephone Time is an American anthology drama series that aired on CBS in 1956, and on ABC from 1957 to 1958. The series features plays by John Nesbitt who hosted the first season. Frank C. Baxter hosted the 1957 and 1958 seasons. The program was directed by Arthur Hiller, Robert Florey, and Lewis Allen (director). A total of 81 episodes aired from April 1956 to March 1957 on CBS, and from April 1957 to April 1958 on ABC.

Overview
The program showcased the talents of actors and actresses such as Bette Davis, Florenz Ames, Greer Garson, Dennis Morgan, Joseph Cotten, Claudette Colbert, Michael Landon, Cloris Leachman, Johnny Crawford, Katherine Warren, Joel Grey, Fay Wray, Thomas Mitchell, Vivi Janiss, Wright King, Strother Martin, Lon Chaney, Jr., Boris Karloff, John Carradine, Helen Wallace, and Michael Winkelman. Famed circus performer Emmett Kelly made his dramatic debut in the presentation Captain from Kopenick. Famed radio star Michael Raffetto appeared in the "Vicksburg, 5:35 PM" episode as Joe Palermo (1956).

Award nomination
John Nesbitt was nominated for an Emmy Award in 1957 for Best Teleplay Writing - Half Hour or Less.

Episodes
 1.01 The Golden Junkman
 1.02 Man With A Beard
 1.03 Captain From Kopenick
 1.04 Borders Away
 1.05 The Mystery Of Caspar Hauser
 1.06 The Stepmother
 1.07 Time Bomb
 1.08 Emperor Norton's Bridge
 1.09 The Man Who Believed In Fairy Tales
 1.10 Harry In Search Of Himself
 1.11 Felix The Fourth
 1.12 Smith Of Ecuador
 1.13 The Gingerbread Man
 1.14 Joyful Lunatic
 1.15 The Key
 1.16 Grandpa Changes The World
 1.17 Again The Stars
 2.01 Keeley's Wonderful Machine
 2.02 I Am Not Alone
 2.03 Mr. And Mrs. Browning
 2.04 Vicksburg, 5:35 Pm
 2.05 The Churchill Club
 2.06 She Sette Her Little Foote
 2.07 Hatfield, The Rainmaker
 2.08 She Also Ran
 2.09 Knockout
 2.10 Chico And The Archbishop
 2.11 Raccoon Hunt
 2.12 Fortunatus
 2.13 Scio, Ohio
 2.14 The Sergeant Boyd Story
 2.15 The Mountain That Moved
 2.16 Passport To Life
 2.17 The Jumping Parson
 2.18 Parents Of A Stranger
 2.19 The Consort
 2.20 The Man Who Discovered O. Henry
 2.21 The Greatest Man In The World
 2.22 The Unsinkable Molly Brown
 2.23 The Intruder
 2.24 Fight For The Title
 2.25 Escape
 2.26 Castle Dangerous
 2.27 Bullet Lou Kirn
 2.28 Elfego Baca
 2.29 Rabbi On Wheels
 2.30 The Diamond Peer
 2.31 Stranded
 2.32 Plot To Save A Boy
 2.33 Line Chief
 2.34 Pit-a-pit And The Dragon
 2.35 The Koshetz Story
 3.01 Revenge
 3.02 Here Lies Francois Gold
 3.03 Campaign For Marriage
 3.04 The Gadfly
 3.05 Hole In The Wall
 3.06 The Man The Navy Couldn't Sink
 3.07 Under Seventeen
 3.08 The Other Van Gogh
 3.09 Arithmetic Sailor
 3.10 I Get Along Without You Very Well
 3.11 Alice's Wedding Gown
 3.12 The Rescue
 3.13 Novel Appeal
 3.14 Sam Houston's Decision
 3.15 The Frying Pan
 3.16 A Picture Of The Magi
 3.17 Death Of A Nobody
 3.18 Abby, Julia And The Seven Pet Cows
 3.19 Cavalry Surgeon
 3.20 A Stubborn Fool
 3.21 Flight For Life
 3.22 The Immortal Eye
 3.23 Recipe For Success
 3.24 The Checkered Flag
 3.25 The Vestris
 3.26 War Against War
 3.27 The Quality Of Mercy
 3.28 Man Of Principle
 3.29 Trail Blazer

References

External links 
  
 Telephone Time (TV series) at CVTA with episode list
 Video of public domain episode I Am Not Alone on the Internet Archive
 Video of public domain episode Recipe for Success on the Internet Archive

1950s American anthology television series
1956 American television series debuts
1958 American television series endings
American Broadcasting Company original programming
1950s American drama television series
Black-and-white American television shows
CBS original programming
English-language television shows
Television series based on plays